A discount store or discounter offers a retail format in which products are sold at prices that are in principle lower than an actual or supposed "full retail price". Discounters rely on bulk purchasing and efficient distribution to keep down costs.

Types (United States)
Discount stores in the United States may be classified into different types:

Hypermarkets (superstores)
Discount superstores such as Walmart or Target sell general merchandise in a big-box store; many have a full grocery selection and are thus hypermarkets, though that term is not generally used in North America. In the 1960s and 1970s the term "discount department store" was used, and chains such as Kmart, Zodys and TG&Y billed themselves as such. The term "discount department store" or "off-price department store" is sometimes applied to big-box discount retailers of apparel and home goods, such as Ross Dress For Less, Marshalls, TJ Maxx, and Kohls.

Category killers
So-called category killer stores, specialize in one type of merchandise and sell it in big-box stores. Examples include:
Apparel: Ross Dress For Less, Marshalls, Kohls, etc.
Pet supplies: Petco, Petsmart
Home furnishings and accessories: Big Lots, HomeGoods
Office supplies: Staples, Office Depot, OfficeMax

Warehouse clubs
When membership is required, discount superstores are known as warehouse clubs, and often require purchases of larger sizes or quantities of goods than a regular superstore. The main national chains, both of which have operations outside the U.S., are Costco and Sam's Club.

Discount grocery store
Major discount grocery store retail chains in the U.S. include Aldi, Ingles, Lidl, Trader Joe's, Save-A-Lot and Grocery Outlet. Currently Aldi and Lidl are the largest discount retailers in the world operating more than 25,000 discount stores worldwide between them.

Variety stores, dollar stores, five and dimes
Variety stores in the U.S. today most commonly known as dollar stores such as Dollar General, Family Dollar and Dollar Tree, which sell goods usually only at a single price-point or multiples thereof (£1, $2, etc.). During the early and mid-twentieth century they were commonly known as "five and dimes" or "dime stores". Stores of the main chains, Woolworth's, J. J. Newberry and S. S. Kresge, lined the shopping streets of U.S. downtowns and suburbs, and starting in the 1950s they also opened branches in shopping malls. These chains originally sold items for 5, 10 or 25 cents, but many later moved to a model with flexible price points, with a variety of general merchandise at discounted prices, in formats smaller than today's discount superstores.

History

United States
During the period from the 1950s to the late 1980s, discount stores were more popular than the average supermarket or department store in the United States. There were hundreds of discount stores in operation, with their most successful period occurring during the mid-1960s in the U.S. with discount store chains such as Kmart, Ames, Two Guys, Gibson's Discount Center, E. J. Korvette, Mammoth Mart, Fisher's Big Wheel, Zayre, Bradlees, Caldor, Jamesway, Howard Brothers Discount Stores, Kuhn's-Big K (sold to Walmart in 1981), TG&Y and Woolco (closed in 1983, part sold to Wal-Mart) among others.

Walmart, Kmart, and Target all opened their first locations in 1962. Kmart was a venture of S. S. Kresge Company that was a major operator of dime stores. Other retail companies branched out into the discount store business around that time as adjuncts to their older store concepts. As examples, Woolworth opened a Woolco chain (also in 1962); Montgomery Ward opened Jefferson Ward; Chicago-based Jewel launched Turn Style; and Central Indiana-based L. S. Ayres created Ayr-Way. J. C. Penney opened discount stores called Treasure Island or The Treasury, Sheboygan, Wisconsin based H. C. Prange Co. opened a chain of discount stores called Prange Way, and Atlanta-based Rich's owned discount stores called Richway.

During the late 1970s and the 1980s, these chains typically were either shut down or sold to a larger competitor.  Kmart and Target themselves are examples of adjuncts, although their growth prompted their respective parent companies to abandon their older concepts (the S. S. Kresge five and dime store disappeared, while the Dayton-Hudson Corporation eventually divested itself of its department store holdings and renamed itself Target Corporation).

In the United States, discount stores had 42% of overall retail market share in 1987; in 2010, they had 87%.

Many of the major discounters now operate "supercenters", which add a full-service grocery store to the traditional format. The Meijer chain in the Midwest consists entirely of supercenters, while Wal-Mart and Target have focused on the format as of the 1990s as a key to their continued growth. Although discount stores and department stores have different retailing goals and different markets, a recent development in retailing is the "discount department store", such as Sears Essentials, which is a combination of the Kmart and Sears formats, after the companies' merger as Sears Holdings Corporation.

Canada
Woolworths entered Canada in the 1920s, the stores were converted to the Foot Locker, Champs Sports and other stores in 1994. Kresge's, a competitor to Woolworth's entered the Canadian market in 1929.

Zellers was founded in 1931, and was acquired by the Hudson's Bay Company in 1978. Giant Tiger opened its first store in Ottawa in 1961, modeled on Woolworths. Winners was founded in 1982 in Toronto, and sells off-price brand clothing. Costco entered Canada in 1986.  In 1990, the American chain Walmart purchased the Woolco chain in Canada, and converted the stores to Walmarts. Dollarama was founded in Quebec in 1992.  In 1998, Zellers bought out Kmart Canada, taking over its stores.

In 2011, Marshalls, owned by the American TJX Companies, entered Canada, and Zellers sold most of its stores to Target. Target Canada filed for bankruptcy in 2015, selling its stores to Walmart, Lowe's and Canadian Tire.

In 2016, the Hudson's Bay Company started opening Saks Off 5th locations to sell off-price brands. American off-price chain Nordstrom Rack opened its first Canadian location in Vaughan Mills in 2018.

Transnationals
 Aldi
  BİM
 Costco
 Daiso
 Dia (supermarket chain)
 Lidl
 Netto (store)
 Penny
 TJX Companies
 Usave
 Walmart

By country
Outside the United States and Canada, the main discount store chains listed by country are as follows:

Australia
Aldi
Big W, Kmart, Target, The Reject Shop, Cheap and Chips, Dollars and Sense, Shiploads, Red Dot.

Argentina
 Dia

Austria
 Lidl
 Aldi
 Penny

Angola
Usave

Belgium
Aldi
Lidl

Botswana
Usave

Bosnia and Herzegovina
Lidl

Brazil
 Dia (supermarket chain)

Bulgaria
Lidl
Kam Market

Chile
Justo y Bueno

China
Aldi

Colombia
 
 ARA (Jerónimo Martins)
 Dollarcity
 Ísimo, formerly Justo Y Bueno

Costa Rica
Pali
Pequeno Mundo

Croatia
Eurospin
Lidl

Cyprus
Lidl

Czech
Lidl

Denmark
Aldi
Lidl

Greece
Lidl

Guatemala
Super del Barrio
Despensa Familiar
Dollar City

Egypt
 BIM

El Salvador

Dollar City

Estonia
Lidl

Eswatini
Usave
Boxer superstores

Finland

 Lidl
 HalpaHalli
 Kärkkäinen
 Tokmanni

Germany
Major chains of discount supermarkets in Germany are Aldi, Lidl, Netto Marken-Discount, Netto (store), Norma and Penny.

Honduras

Latvia
Lidl

Hungary
Aldi
Lidl

Ireland
Aldi
Lidl

Lithuania
Aldi
Lidl

Luxembourg
Aldi
Lidl

Italy

Japan
Japan has numerous discount stores, including Costco, Daiso, Don Quijote (store) and The Price (owned by Ito Yokado).

Malaysia
Eco-shop
Mr Dollar

Malta
Lidl

Malawi
Usave

Mexico
Tiendas Neto
Tiendas 3B
Superissste
Waldo's
BodegaAurrera

Lesotho
Usave

Morocco
 BIM

Mozambique
Usave

Namibia
Usave

The Netherlands
Action, Euroland, Solow, Big Bazar and Zeeman. In addition, the German discount supermarkets Lidl and Aldi both operate in the country.

New Zealand
PAKnSAVE

North Macedonia
Lidl

Nicaragua

Peru
Tiendas Mass

Poland

Discount supermarkets cover about 30% of food sales in Poland. Main chains include Biedronka, Lidl, Netto, and Aldi.

Portugal
Aldi
Lidl
Minipreço / Dia (supermarket chain)
Plus sold to Jerónimo Martins
Netto converted into Intermarché

Panama
 Justo Y Bueno

Romania
lidl
Penny

Russia
Dixy
Nahodka
Kopeyka
Fix Price
Da!
Svetofor
Krasny Yar
Chizik
365+
Моя цена (My Price)

Serbia
Lidl
Svetofor

Slovakia
Lidl

Slovenia
Aldi
Lidl

South Africa
Savers Lane
Usave
Boxer Superstores

Spain
 Dia (supermarket chain)
 Aldi
 Lidl
 Mere

Sweden
Lidl

Switzerland
Aldi
Lidl

Turkey
Şok Market
BİM
A101
Hakmar
File

Ukraine
 ATB

United Kingdom
Aldi
Lidl
Farmfoods

Venezuela
Tiendas Ovejita
Tiendas Daka

See also 
 Everyday low price
 Dollar store (five and dime, variety store)
 Hypermarket
 Warehouse club
 No frills
 Charity shop
 Types of retail outlets

References

Further reading
Nelson, Walter Henry, The Great Discount Delusion, New York:  D. McKay, 1965.

Retail formats